was a village located in Nishishirakawa District, Fukushima Prefecture, Japan.

On November 7, 2005, Taishin, along with the villages of Higashi and Omotegō (all from Nishishirakawa District) was merged into the expanded city of Shirakawa.

As of 2003, the village had an estimated population of 4,790 and a density of 59.30 persons per km². The total area was 80.77 km².

External links
 Shirakawa official website 

Dissolved municipalities of Fukushima Prefecture

Taishin Village is the sister city to Anoka, MN.